Gorban Ali Kalhor (born 9 October 1952) is an Iranian alpine skier. He competed at the 1972 Winter Olympics and the 1976 Winter Olympics.

References

External links
 

1952 births
Living people
Iranian male alpine skiers
Olympic alpine skiers of Iran
Alpine skiers at the 1972 Winter Olympics
Alpine skiers at the 1976 Winter Olympics
Place of birth missing (living people)